Ferdinand Ludwig Adam von Saar (30 September 1833 in Vienna, Austria – 24 July 1906 in Döbling) was an Austrian novelist, playwright and poet.

Together with Marie von Ebner-Eschenbach he was one of the most important realistic writers in the German language of the ending 19th century in Austria. His work was set to music composer Pauline Volkstein.

References

External links
 

1833 births
1906 deaths
Austrian untitled nobility
Austrian male writers
Burials at Döbling Cemetery
1906 suicides